The Pelly Mountains are a mountain range in the Yukon, Canada.

Sub-ranges
Big Salmon Range
Glenlyon Range
Saint Cyr Range

See also
List of mountain ranges

References

Mountain ranges of Yukon